William Abdy is the name of:

Sir William Abdy, 4th Baronet (1689–1750), English landowner
Sir William Abdy, 6th Baronet (ca. 1732–1803), Royal Navy officer
Sir William Abdy, 7th Baronet (1779–1868), English landowner and Member of Parliament for Malmesbury
Sir William Abdy, 2nd Baronet (1844–1910), English aristocrat

See also
Abdy baronets